is a Japanese manga series written and illustrated by Yoko Kamio. It takes place in the fictional "Eitoku Academy" (an elite school for children from rich families). It tells the story of Tsukushi Makino, a girl from a middle-class family, whose mother enrolls her in an elite high school to compete with the families from her husband's company. While at Eitoku, she encounters the F4, a gang of four boys who are children of Japan's wealthiest families and who bully anyone that gets in their way.

The manga was launched in Shueisha's Margaret magazine in October 1992 and ran until January 2004. Two epilogue chapters were later published in Margaret, in July 2006 and January 2008. The English translation was published by Viz Media from August 2003 to October 2009.

The manga has been adapted into various mediums. It was first adapted as an audio drama released on CD from July 1993 to July 1994. This was followed by a Japanese live-action feature film in 1995, then an animated television series, produced by Toei Animation, that was broadcast by ABC from 1996 to 1997. The first live-action television adaptation was one produced in Taiwan, titled Meteor Garden (2001). After Taiwan's Meteor Garden, a number of other live-action television adaptations have  followed. A Japanese live-action series aired from 2005 to 2007 (and was followed by a 2008 film), a South Korean adaptation aired in 2009, a mainland Chinese adaptation, also titled Meteor Garden aired in 2018, and a Thai adaptation, F4 Thailand: Boys Over Flowers, was aired from 2021 to 2022.

In 1996, Boys Over Flowers won the 41st Shogakukan Manga Award for the shōjo category. As of February 2015, the series had over 61 million copies in circulation, making it one of the best-selling manga series of all time and the best-selling shōjo manga of all time. The series enjoys immense popularity in the Eastern Asia region.

Plot
 in Yamanote, Japan is a prestigious school that caters to children from upper-class families. Hence, Tsukushi Makino, who comes from a middle-class family, fulfills the literal meaning of her name, as she is initially considered to be the "weed" of the school. The school is ruled by the F4 ("Flower Four"), four young men from Japan's wealthiest families. Tsukasa Domyoji is the son of the wealthiest, most powerful family in Japan. They initially bully Tsukushi when she stands up to them. However, Domyoji eventually takes an interest in her because she is the only girl in the school who stands up to him.
Tsukushi, however, is repulsed by his hot-headed nature and bullying demeanor, falling instead for soft-spoken and sensitive Rui Hanazawa, Tsukasa's best friend since childhood.

The other two members of the F4 are Akira Mimasaka, the laid-back peacemaker of the group, and Sojirou Nishikado, an unrepentant playboy. They both usually have at least one girlfriend at any one time; Akira prefers older women because the women of his household (his mother and two younger sisters) are quite childish. Sojirou is happy to be in casual relationships with many women, although we later discover that at one time he was in love with a childhood friend. Over time, Tsukushi's feelings towards Tsukasa evolve, as she begins to appreciate the degree of change that occurred in Tsukasa once he fell in love with her. However, because of the difference in social class, Tsukushi and Tsukasa's relationship is blocked by Tsukasa's mother, Kaede but supported by his elder sister, Tsubaki, who becomes friends with Tsukushi.

Characters

The protagonist is a teenage high school girl whose name, Tsukushi, means "weed". She is thus the "weed" that will challenge the "Flower Four" or F4. Tsukushi is one of the very few students studying at Eitoku High School to come from a middle-class family. Her mother pushed her to join Eitoku because the children of her father's work colleagues all attend prestigious schools. Tsukushi is unhappy at Eitoku, but feels if she quietly exists for two years, she can survive it. However, after defending her friend who accidentally falls down a set of stairs and onto the leader of the F4, Tsukasa Domyoji, she, instead, receives a red card—a declaration of war. This officially marks her for future torment by the F4 and the rest of the student body.
However, unlike most of the F4's targets, Tsukushi retaliates by directly attacking Tsukasa. This unexpected retaliation and steadfast resistance to the hazing is one that he has never encountered from a target before, and falls in love with Tsukushi. Initially, Tsukushi hates all of the F4 except Rui Hanazawa, for whom she harbors romantic feelings. But, after Rui admits that he will never stop loving his childhood sweetheart Shizuka, Tsukushi slowly falls in love with Tsukasa and becomes friends with the F4.

Tsukasa is the leader of the F4 group and the heir to the large Domyoji Enterprises. He grew up with the rest of the F4 as his mother was always overseas, and his older sister relocated to Los Angeles after her marriage. His mother, in particular, is cold towards him, and wants to control his life for the sake of preserving the family name.
As the extremely hot-headed and volatile leader of the F4, Tsukasa uses his power to rule over the entire school. He uses an infamous red card and attaches it inside anyone's locker who has made the F4, particularly him, upset. A red card gives the entire student body at Eitoku free rein to bully, prank, and humiliate the receiver until they decide to leave the school. However, Tsukushi's declaration of war against the F4 after receiving the red card, retaliation against the student body and strong will, reminds Tsukasa of his beloved older sister, Tsubaki. He thus grows fond of Tsukushi, eventually falling madly in love with her.

Rui is Tsukasa's best friend and Tsukushi's first romantic interest. He is generally quiet, distant, uninterested in people and is said to be autistic. He only opens up to his close friends and the model Shizuka Todo, for whom he was bethrolled since at birth. Rui admires Tsukushi's courage in standing up to Tsukasa and eventually begins to help her. After he comes back from France and witnessing Shizuka's marriage, Rui was very frustrated and slowly falls in love with Tsukushi. However, after learning that Tsukushi genuinely loves Tsukasa, Rui backs off.

Sojirou is the biggest playboy of the F4. He is devoted to the practice of traditional Japanese tea ceremonies (which is his family's business). For the most part, he and Akira usually work to keep the peace within the group and following Tsukasa.

Akira is arguably the kindest and most mature member of F4. His family is very powerful in the Japanese underground (in the manga they own a large trading company). He keeps his cool and rarely loses his temper, although when he does, even Domyoji has to run for the hills. He has a pair of young twin sisters who annoy him due to their intense affection for him.

Yuuki is Tsukushi's childhood friend. The two work together at a dango shop after school. Yuuki cares a lot about Tsukushi's feelings, and does not want anybody to hurt Tsukushi. Yuuki offers Tsukushi a lot of encouragement and advice about her situation with the F4.

Shizuka is a rich heiress, a fashion model, and a childhood friend of the F4, particularly Rui. She was the first person who was able to get him to come out of his shell, and the two were inseparable for much of their childhood. She began a modeling career during her high school years, but at her twentieth birthday party she announces that she will give up her career as a model as well as her position as the Todou heiress to move to Paris and become a human rights lawyer. She was very kind toward Tsukushi, as she sees her as Rui's romantic interest. Rui initially accompanies Shizuka to Paris at Tsukushi's request, but their relationship suffers as Shizuka spends more and more time at work. Towards the end of the manga series, Rui tell's Tsukushi that what happened between him and Shizuka is completely over and thats okay with him, they're on good terms and are still friends.

Kazuya is another one of Tsukushi's childhood friends. He enrolls at Eitoku after his family comes into money through some real-estate deals. The other students at Eitoku draw a sharp distinction between Kazuya's "new money" and their "old money". The F4, in particular, mention this difference fairly often and consider him to be a nuisance as the story progresses, and simply tolerate him because of Tsukushi's fondness for him.

Makiko is one of Tsukushi's only friends at Eitoku in the beginning of the series. Tsukushi rescues her from inevitable torment after she collides with Domyouji on the stairs. Although she is forced to break off their friendship to prevent becoming a target of abuse, Makiko finds ways to help Tsukushi, sending her secret messages of encouragement or to warn her of impending danger.

Sakurako was the target of bullying as a young child, particularly by the F4, because she was born "ugly". When she confessed her love to Domyoji, he traumatized her by making fun of her looks. She eventually moved to Germany because of her family's business, and underwent plastic surgery to end the bullying. Many years later, she returns to Eitoku, where no one recognizes her now attractive face. She plans to take revenge on the F4, and befriends Tsukushi (who is unaware of her history). When she hears of Domyoji's growing attraction to Tsukushi, she conspires with her friend Thomas to destroy her.

Junpei is a kōhai of Tsukushi's that saves her from being bullied after she gets back from her trip to Canada. He first appears as a nerdy boy, with glasses and an oblivious attitude. He is actually a famous model for a well-known magazine, hiding his identity in school through his glasses. Tskushi sees him as the only other person at school who thinks the way she thinks after he says he only needs to endure two more years. Junpei's real motive is to lure Domyoji in order to take revenge for an injury his older brother endured. He uses Tsukushi as bait to lure Tsukasa to him and his friend, who are looking for vengeance after being humiliated by Tsukasa.

Shigeru is the heiress of the Okawahara Corporation, and Tsukasa's fiance for the arranged marriage created by his mother. Tsukasa neither likes nor wants to marry her, although she falls in love with him. She also befriends Tsukushi without knowing of her past relationship with Tsukasa.

Tsubaki is Tsukasa's elder sister, and closest friend. Although she bullies him, he adores and trusts her more than anyone else, as she raised him in the absence of their parents. After she graduated from Eitoku, she dated a working class man, which led to her mother forcing them apart so that Tsubaki could marry a wealthier man. Although she has obtained a degree of happiness in her marriage, she often gets sad and travels home to Japan when her husband is busy overseas. She begs Tsukasa not to make the same mistake in love. She sees Tsukushi as a younger sister, and always helps with her relationship with Tsukasa.

Kaede is Tsukasa's controlling mother and is the chairwoman of Domyoji Enterprises. She is a powerful and feared businesswoman who does everything she can to end Tsukushi's relationship with Tsukushi. At one point, she tried to pay Tsukushi 50 million yen to get her to agree not to see Tsukasa again. However, Tsukushi's mother refused the money and poured salt onto Kaede's head because Kaede had insulted Tsukushi. Kaede then tried to force Tsukasa to marry Shigeru. When she found out that Tsukasa was going to break up with Shigeru, she became furious and forced Tsukasa to marry Shigeru quickly. When Shigeru and Tsukasa "marry", she witnesses Shigeru's true plan to set Tsukasa and Tsukushi up and even tries to stop it at first. But after knowing that Tsukushi truly cares about Tsukasa and everyone else, she accepts their relationship and eventual marriage.

Media

Manga

Boys Over Flowers was serialized in Shueisha's bi-weekly magazine Margaret magazine from October 1992 to January 2004. It was also serialized into 36 stand-alone volumes between 1992 and 2004, with an epilogue (issue #37) that came out in 2008. English translations of all 37 volumes were released between 2003 and 2009. It has also been published by Glénat in France, and by Planeta DeAgostini in Spain.

Kamio began a sequel, Boys Over Flowers Season 2, in Shueisha's Shōnen Jump+ online magazine on February 15, 2015. In July 2006, a short story based on the manga was published in issue 15 of Margaret magazine. Another two-installment short story was published in January 2007. Both short stories were by Yoko Kamio.

CD
It starred Takuya Kimura, in his voice-acting debut, as the voice of Rui Hanazawa, whom this adaptation focused on.

Live-action television and films

Anime
An anime television series produced by Toei Animation and broadcast on television by Asahi Broadcasting Corporation and TV Asahi in 1996. It was followed by a spin-off theatrical short film, set in an alternate universe, in 1997. The anime was later released in Northern America on DVD by Viz Media in 2003, as Boys Over Flowers. It was then rereleased by Discotek Media in 2016, as Hana yori Dango.

List of episodes

Reception
Boys Over Flowers won the 41st Shogakukan Manga Award for the shōjo category in 1996. As of February 2015, the series had over 61 million copies in circulation, making it one of the best-selling manga series of all time and the best-selling shōjo manga of all time. On TV Asahi's Manga Sōsenkyo 2021 poll, in which 150.000 people voted for their top 100 manga series, Boys Over Flowers ranked 70th.

Legacy

F4 and JVKV

F4 (Flower Four) or JVKV was a Taiwanese boy band consisting of cast members of the 2001 Taiwanese version, Meteor Garden: Jerry Yan, Vanness Wu, Ken Chu, and Vic Chou. It formed in 2001 after the Meteor Garden series ended. They released three albums, Meteor Rain (2001), Fantasy 4ever (2002), and Waiting for You (2007). According to Forbes, F4 has sold 3.5 million copies of their first two albums all over Asia as of July 2003. In 2007, due to copyright issues, the group changed its name to JVKV, using the initials of its members in descending order their ages.

References

Further reading

External links
 

1992 manga
 
Manga adapted into films
Shōjo manga
Shueisha franchises
Shueisha manga
Winners of the Shogakukan Manga Award for shōjo manga
Works about school bullying